Jason Goulet (born February 25, 1983) is a Canadian former professional ice hockey defenceman.

Playing career 
Goulet played junior hockey in the Western Hockey League for the Saskatoon Blades and the Prince George Cougars.  He also played in the Saskatchewan Junior Hockey League for the Battlefords North Stars.  He began his pro career in the ECHL with the Fresno Falcons.  He then moved to the Oklahoma City Blazers of the Central Hockey League. He split the 2006-07 season in the ECHL with the Pensacola Ice Pilots and the Cincinnati Cyclones and the American Hockey League with the Bridgeport Sound Tigers.  He then split the 2007-08 season with ECHL teams the Bakersfield Condors and the Dayton Bombers.  In 2008, Goulet signed with the Basingstoke Bison of the United Kingdom.

On November 29, 2008, Goulet was signed by the newly-formed Rapid City Rush of the Central Hockey League (CHL). On that same day he played his first game with his new team - the Rush's inaugural home game and the first professional hockey game in South Dakota sports history. During the game he recorded the first fight in Rush franchise history when he faced off with the Colorado Eagles' Jay Birnie.

In September 2009 Goulet was signed by the Quad City Mallards of the International Hockey League.

In the 2010–11 off-season, Goulet signed a one-year deal with the Wichita Thunder of the Central Hockey League. After a solitary season, on August 8, 2011, he moved to the Arizona Sundogs on a one-year contract for the 2011–12 season.

Career statistics

References

External links

1983 births
Living people
Arizona Sundogs players
Bakersfield Condors (1998–2015) players
Basingstoke Bison players
Bridgeport Sound Tigers players
Canadian expatriate ice hockey players in England
Canadian expatriate ice hockey players in the United States
Canadian ice hockey defencemen
Cincinnati Cyclones (ECHL) players
Dayton Bombers players
Fresno Falcons players
Kalamazoo Wings (UHL) players
Manitoba Moose players
Oklahoma City Blazers (1992–2009) players
Pensacola Ice Pilots players
Prince George Cougars players
Rapid City Rush players
Saskatoon Blades players
Ice hockey people from Winnipeg
Wichita Thunder players